A Taste of Strawbs is a box-set album by Strawbs. Instead of being a "best of" album, the compilers (Dave Cousins and Dick Greener) have attempted to present alternative versions of some well-known songs plus some previously unreleased material. Included are some very old songs by The Strawberry Hill Boys, with Dave Cousins, Tony Hooper and Ron Chesterman, also are some very interesting songs by Sandy Denny and The Strawbs, and outtakes from different periods of the band's career.

Track listing

CD 1 – Eyes Wide Open
"The Grey Hawk" (traditional) Strawberry Hill Boys live recording
"The Cruel Wars (Higher Germanie)" (traditional) Dave Cousins unreleased recording
"You Don't Think About Me" Strawberry Hill Boys demo
"Not All The Flowers Grow" (Dave Cousins) Dave Cousins demo
"You Keep Going Your Way" (Cousins) Strawberry Hill Boys demo
"Sail Away to the Sea" (Cousins) Sandy Denny and the Strawbs
"Nothing Else Will Do" (Cousins) Sandy Denny and the Strawbs
"Oh How She Changed" (Cousins, Tony Hooper) 2005 re-mix
"Or Am I Dreaming" (Cousins) 2005 re-mix
"All The Little Ladies" (Cousins, Hooper) Alternative mix with spoken word intro and outro
"Ah Me, Ah My" (Hooper) Alternate mix
"The Man Who Called Himself Jesus" (Cousins) Alternative mix
"The Battle" (Cousins) Live
"It's Just Love" (Dave Lambert) Unreleased Fire recording
"Another Day" (Cousins) Live
"Forever" (Cousins, Hooper) Dragonfly outtake
"Where am I"/"I'll Show You Where to Sleep" (Cousins) 1970 live track
"Canondale" (Richard Hudson) 1971 live instrumental track
"RMW" (Rick Wakeman) 1971 live track
"Sheep" (Cousins) 1971 live version

CD 2 – Changing Places
"Tomorrow" (Cousins, Hooper, Hudson, John Ford, Blue Weaver) 1972 live version
"New World" (Cousins) 1972 live version
"Here It Comes" (Cousins) 1972 live version
"See How They Run" (Cousins, Lambert) Cousins and Lambert 1972 home demo
"Going Home" (Cousins) Alternative version with Dave Lambert singing
"The Actor" (Cousins) Alternative mix
"Part of the Union" (Hudson, Ford) The original version which was to be released by "The Brothers"
"The Winter and the Summer" (Lambert) Dave Lambert home demo
"Whichever Way the Wind Blows" (Cousins) Previously unreleased version with Dave Cousins on vocals
"Shine on Silver Sun" (Cousins) Extended version with Cousins, Lambert and members of Ten Years After
"Out in the Cold"/"Round and Round" (Cousins) Dave Cousins acoustic demos
"The Writing on the Wall" (Cousins) Dave Cousins acoustic demo of unreleased song
"The Four Queens"
"Ghosts Theme" (Cousins) church bells – field recording
"Lemon Pie" (Cousins) Dave Cousins acoustic demo
"Cherie Je T'aime" (Cousins) French version of "Grace Darling"
"So Shall Our Love Die" (Cousins) Dave Cousins acoustic demo
"Still Small Voice" (Cousins) Dave Cousins acoustic demo
"How I Need You Now" (Cousins) Live recording from The Old Grey Whistle Test with John Mealing

CD 3 – Inside Out
"The Merchant Adventurer" (Cousins) Dave Cousins demo of unreleased song
"Blue Angel" (Cousins) out-take from Deep Cuts sessions
"Goodbye" (Cousins) alternative version from the album Burning for You
'Deadly Nightshade' Dave Cousins acoustic demo
"Midnight" out-take from first Deadlines sessions
"Sweet Voices" out-take from first Deadlines sessions
"Bring Out Your Dead" (Cousins, Wakeman) Dave Cousins acoustic demo (aka "The Young Pretender")
"Another Day Without You" (Cousins) demo version
"Touch the Earth" (Lambert, Chas Cronk) Lambert and Cronk studio recording
"Armada" Juan Martin and Strawbs 1981 studio recording
"A Glimpse of Heaven" (Cousins) Cousins and Willoughby live at Sidmouth Folk Festival
"The Hangman and the Papist" (Cousins) a recording made for Rick Wakeman's Gastank programme
"I'll Carry On Beside You" (Cousins) 1983 Cambridge Folk Festival
"Heavy Disguise" (Ford) 1984 rehearsal recording
"That's When the Crying Starts" (Cousins) 1984 live recording
"Evergreen" (Cousins) Dave Cousins home demo
"Song of a Sad Little Girl" (Cousins) 1988 Wakeman and Cousins live recording

CD 4 – Further Down the Road
"Ringing Down the Years" (Cousins) 1990 Strawbs live recording
"Further Down the Road" (Cousins) Dave Cousins acoustic demo
"Heartbreak Hill" (Cousins, Cronk) 1993 silver jubilee tour with Don Airey
"Extravaganza on a Theme of Strawbs" (Don Airey) Don Airey solo from 1993 silver jubilee tour
"File of Facts" (Cousins, Airey) 1993 Dave Cousins and Don Airey recording
"Hero and Heroine" (Cousins) Chiswick House concert recording with guest Ric Sanders
"The Ten Commandments" Dave Lambert and Brian Willoughby from 2001 tour
"The King" (Cousins) Wakeman and Cousins Hummingbird album outtake
"Hummingbird" instrumental outtake from Wakeman and Cousins Hummingbird album
"Alice's Song" (Craig, Willoughby) 2003 live Acoustic Strawbs recording
"McLean Street"/"Who Knows Where the Time Goes" (Sandy Denny) 2004 live recording
"We'll Meet Again Sometime" (Cousins) 2004 Acoustic Strawbs recording
"Sunday Morning" (Cousins, Lambert) single mix
"On a Night Like This" (Cousins) acoustic version
"Dragonfly" (Cousins) live 2005 version
"Canada" (Cousins) new Dave Cousins solo song
"Here Today, Gone Tomorrow" (Cousins) live 2006 recording

CD 5 – Tastebuds (bonus disc)
"The Happiest Boy in Town" (Cousins) Strawberry Hill Boys demo
"Draught Raga" (Hudson, Ford) 1970 live sitar instrumental
"Ways and Means" (Cousins) Two Weeks Last Summer outtake
"Rip it Off Blues" (Cousins) Dave Cousins demo
"Stay Awhile With Me" (Cousins) Dave Cousins version of Strawberry Sampler Number 1 track
"Oh So Sleepy" (Cousins) outtake from the Deep Cuts album
"Barcarole" (Cousins, Cronk) instrumental outtake from the album Burning for You
"Time and Life" (Cousins, Cronk) Dave Cousins home demo
"Heartbreaker" (Wil Malone) from the Intergalactic Touring Band album
"Andalucian Express" Strawbs with Juan Martin
"Lay Down" (Cousins) 1984 live version
"Over the Hill" (Blue Weaver) Blue Weaver solo track
"You Never Needed Water" (Cousins) originally on the Cousins & Willoughby album The Bridge
"If" (Cousins) Acoustic Strawbs
"Cold Steel" (Lambert) Folk Scene live recording
"The River" (Cousins)/"Down by the Sea" (Cousins) Strawbs live in Thalgau 2006

Personnel
Dave Cousins – lead vocals, backing vocals, acoustic guitar, dulcimer, banjo

Most of the musicians from the various incarnations of Strawbs over the years play on the various tracks. For a full list see the article on the band.

References

A Taste of Strawbs on Strawbsweb

2006 compilation albums
Strawbs compilation albums